Maaloula or Maʿlūlā ( in Eastern Aramaic Syriac script,  in Western Aramaic Maalouli script) is a town in the Rif Dimashq Governorate in Syria. The town is located 56 km to the northeast of Damascus and built into the rugged mountainside, at an altitude of more than 1500 m. It is known as one of three remaining villages where Western Aramaic – said to be the language of Jesus – is spoken, the other two being the nearby, smaller villages of Jubb'adin and Bakhah.

Etymology
 is said to derive from the Aramaic word , meaning 'entrance'. The name is romanized in multiple different ways, e.g. Maaloula, Ma'loula, Maalula, Ma'lula, Malula. However, "Maaloula" is the most common one.

Population
In 1838, its inhabitants were Greek Orthodox Church of Antioch Christians, Melkite Greek Catholic Church Christians, and Sunni Muslim.

Half a century ago, 15,000 people lived in Maaloula.

According to the Syria Central Bureau of Statistics, Maaloula had a population of 2,762 in the 2004 census. However, during summer, it increases to about 10,000, due to people coming from Damascus for holidays.

Religiously, the population consists of both Christians (mainly members of the Greek Orthodox Church of Antioch and the Melkite Greek Catholic Church) and Muslims. For the Muslim inhabitants, the legacy is all the more remarkable given that they didn't fully switch to Arabic, which holds special significance in Islam, unlike other Syrians who were Islamised over the centuries.

Language

With two other nearby towns, al-Sarkha (Bakhah) and Jubb'adin, Maaloula is the only place where a Western Aramaic language is still spoken, which it has been able to retain amidst the rise of Arabic due to its distance from other major cities and its isolating geological features. However, modern roads and transportation, as well as accessibility to Arabic-language television and print media – and for some time until recently, also state policy – have eroded that linguistic heritage.

As the last remaining area where Western Neo-Aramaic is still spoken, the three villages represent an important source for anthropological linguistic studies regarding first century Western Aramaic. According to scholarly consensus, the language of Jesus was also Western Aramaic (more specifically, the Galilean variety of Jewish Palestinian Aramaic).

Monasteries
There are two important monasteries in Maaloula: the Melkite Greek Catholic Church Mar Sarkis and Greek Orthodox Church of Antioch Convent of Saint Thecla.

Saint Sarkis Monastic Complex

The Saint Sarkis Monastic Complex of Maaloula is one of the oldest surviving monasteries in Syria. It was built on the site of a pagan temple, and has elements which go back to the fifth to sixth century Byzantine period.

Saint Sarkis is the Syriac name for Saint Sergius, a Roman soldier who was executed for his Christian beliefs. This monastery still maintains its solemn historical character.

The monastery has two of the oldest icons in the world, one depicting the Last Supper.

Convent of Saint Thecla

This convent holds the remains of Thecla, which the second-century Acts of Paul and Thecla accounts a noble virgin and pupil of Paul the Apostle. According to later legend not in the Acts, Thecla was being pursued by soldiers of her father to capture her because of her Christian faith. She came upon a mountain, and after praying, the mountain split open and let her escape through. The town gets its name from this gap or entrance in the mountain. However, there are many variations to this story among the residents of Maaloula.

Other monasteries
There are also the remains of numerous monasteries, convents, churches, shrines and sanctuaries. There are some that lie in ruins, while others continue to stand, defying age. Many pilgrims come to Maaloula, both Muslim and Christian, and they go there to gain blessings and make offerings.

War in Syria 

Maaloula became the scene of battle between the Al-Qaeda-linked insurgent group Al-Nusra Front and the Syrian Army in September 2013.

The insurgents took over the town on October 21. Around 13 people were killed, with many more wounded.

On October 28, government forces recaptured the town.

Maaloula was taken over by al-Nusra Front, opposing the Syrian government, again on December 3, 2013. The group took 12 Orthodox nuns as hostages. The nuns were moved between different locations and ended up in Yabroud where they were held for three months. Officials from Qatar and Lebanon negotiated a deal for their release. Those negotiations produced an agreement on a prisoner exchange under which around 150 Syrian women detained by the government were also freed.   After the nuns were freed on the 9th of March 2014, they stated that they were mostly treated well by their captors.

On 14 April 2014, with the help of Hezbollah and SSNP, the Syrian Army once more took control of Maaloula. This government success was part of a string of other successes in the strategic Qalamoun region, including the seizure of the former rebel bastion of Yabroud in the previous month.

Virgin Mary statue

The people of Maaloula celebrated as a new statue of Mary, mother of Jesus was erected in its centre, replacing the figure destroyed in Islamists attacks in 2013. On 13 June 2015, Syrian officials unveiled the new statue of the Virgin Mary, draped in a white robe topped with a blue shawl, her hands lifted in prayer. The fibreglass figure stood at just over 3 metres (10 feet) tall and was placed on the base of the original statue.

The statue is titled "Lady of Peace".

Climate

Sister city

 Béziers,  (2014)

See also
 Western Neo-Aramaic

References

Bibliography

External links

Yawna Maaloula Aramaic A non-profit educational initiative dedicated to the preservation of Aramaic - the language of Jesus - and the rich cultural heritage of Maaloula.
A web site dedicated to Maaloula
New York Times article on Aramaic language in Maaloula and other villages in Syria
Syrian village clings to Aramaic language at Al Jazeera English
An episode from Australian program, Foreign Correspondent, about Maaloula.
 The dialect of Maalula. Grammar, vocabulary and texts. (1897–1898) By Jean Parisot (in French): Parts 1, 2, 3 at the Internet Archive.
 Samples of spoken Maaloula Aramaic at the Semitisches Tonarchiv (Semitic Audio Archive)

Christian monasteries in Syria
Christian communities in Syria
Populated places in Al-Qutayfah District
Towns in Syria
Eastern Orthodox Christian communities in Syria